Palmer's tree frog (Hyloscirtus palmeri) is a species of frog in the family Hylidae found in Colombia, Costa Rica, Ecuador, and Panama. Its natural habitats are subtropical or tropical moist lowland forests, subtropical or tropical moist montane forests, and rivers.
It is threatened by habitat loss.

References

Hyloscirtus
Amphibians of Colombia
Amphibians of Costa Rica
Amphibians of Ecuador
Amphibians of Panama
Amphibians described in 1908
Taxonomy articles created by Polbot